Canta Gallo  is a corregimiento in Alanje District, Chiriquí Province, Panama. It was created by Law 41 of April 30, 2003.

References

Corregimientos of Chiriquí Province